EIV-1 is an Oil and Gas exploration area in Suceava, Romania covering 998km2. It is currently owned 50% by Raffles Energy and 50% H2Oil Group.

Currently the field has one producing gas well - Bainet-1.

References

Geography of Suceava County